Tungamah  is a town in the Goulburn Valley region of northern Victoria, Australia. The town is located in the Shire of Moira local government area,  from the state capital, Melbourne.

History
Tungamah takes its name from the Aboriginal word for the brush turkey. Tungamah Post Office opened on 15 October 1880.

Today
Major industries in the Tungamah area include grain production, wool growing, dairy farming and sheep and beef farming.

The town has an Australian Rules football team competing in the Picola and District Football League.

The town also boasts a general store, a Mechanics Institute, a hotel with accommodation and meals, and service, sporting and general interest clubs, such as lawn bowls, Lions International, Leo's, Police & Citizens Youth Club, tennis and Senior Citizens.

Tungamah is home to the first silo to be painted in north-east Victoria and the beginning of the North East Victoria Silo Art Trail. The silos are privately owned and Western Australian street artist Sobrane Simcock was commissioned to paint them in 2018. The murals show a Laughing Kookaburra and dancing Brolgas.

Transport 
Tungamah has a railway freight station with a silo on the Oaklands railway line, Victoria.  A daily passenger bus service runs between Benalla and Mulwala (NSW).

See also 
 Tungamah Football Club

Gallery

References 

http://www.censusdata.abs.gov.au/census_services/getproduct/census/2011/quickstat/GL_VIC2589?opendocument&navpos=220

External links 

Moira Shire Council - Official site
Travelmate site
SMH Travel site

Towns in Victoria (Australia)
Shire of Moira